Maraussan is a commune in the Hérault department in southern France.

It lies approximately 8 km northwest of Béziers, on route D14 ( Av de Béziers ), a busy route for commuters to Béziers.

Chateau Perdiguier lies just outside the town on the cross road D39 (Route de Tarbaka) leading down to the river Orb.

Population

See also
Communes of the Hérault department

References

Communes of Hérault